Tax protester Sixteenth Amendment arguments are assertions that the imposition of the U.S. federal income tax is illegal because the Sixteenth Amendment to the United States Constitution, which reads "The Congress shall have power to lay and collect taxes on incomes, from whatever source derived, without apportionment among the several States, and without regard to any census or enumeration", was never properly ratified, or that the amendment provides no power to tax income. Proper ratification of the Sixteenth Amendment is disputed by tax protesters who argue that the quoted text of the Amendment differed from the text proposed by Congress, or that Ohio was not a State during ratification, despite its admission to the Union on March 1, 1803, more than a century prior. Sixteenth Amendment ratification arguments have been rejected in every court case where they have been raised and have been identified as legally frivolous.

Some protesters have argued that because the Sixteenth Amendment does not contain the words "repeal" or "repealed", the Amendment is ineffective to change the law.  Others argue that due to language in Stanton v. Baltic Mining Co., the income tax is an unconstitutional direct tax that should be apportioned (divided equally amongst the population of the various states), despite the court ruling in Stanton that "the provisions of the Sixteenth Amendment conferred no new power of taxation" and that income taxation is a "previous complete and plenary power... possessed by Congress from the beginning".  Several tax protesters assert that the Congress has no constitutional power to tax labor or income from labor, citing a variety of court cases. These arguments include claims that the word "income" as used in the Sixteenth Amendment cannot be interpreted as applying to wages; that wages are not income because labor is exchanged for them; that taxing wages violates individuals' right to property, and several others.  Another argument raised is that because the federal income tax is progressive, the discriminations and inequalities created by the tax should render the tax unconstitutional under the 14th Amendment, which guarantees equal protection under the law. Such arguments have been ruled without merit under contemporary jurisprudence.

Sixteenth Amendment ratification 

Many tax protesters contend that the Sixteenth Amendment to the United States Constitution was never properly ratified (see, e.g., Devvy Kidd).

The "non-ratification" argument was presented by defendant James Walter Scott in the 1975 case of United States v. Scott, some sixty-two years after the ratification. In Scott, the defendant – who called himself a "national tax resistance leader" – had been convicted of willful failure to file federal income tax returns for the years 1969 through 1972, and the conviction was upheld by the United States Court of Appeals for the Ninth Circuit. In the 1977 case of Ex parte Tammen, the United States District Court for the Northern District of Texas noted testimony in the case to the effect that taxpayer Bob Tammen had become involved with a group called "United Tax Action Patriots", a group that took the position "that the Sixteenth Amendment was improperly passed and therefore invalid". The specific issue of the validity of the ratification of the Amendment was neither presented to nor decided by the court in the Tammen case.

After the Scott and Tammen decisions, two lines of court cases eventually developed. The first group of cases deals with the claims of William J. Benson, co-author of the book The Law That Never Was (1985). The second line of cases involves the contention that Ohio was not a state in 1913 at the time of the ratification.

Benson contentions

The William J. Benson contention claims procedural issues in the ratification process, violations of state law, and that the legislatures of various states passed ratifying resolutions in which the quoted text of the Amendment differed from the text proposed by Congress in terms of capitalization, spelling of words, or punctuation marks (e.g. semi-colons instead of commas), and that these differences made the ratification invalid. Benson makes other assertions including claims that one or more states rejected the Amendment and that the state or states were falsely reported as having ratified the Amendment. The Benson arguments have been rejected in every court case where they have been raised, and were explicitly ruled to be fraudulent in 2007.

Benson contended that in Kentucky, the legislature acted on the amendment without having received it from the governor, and that the governor of the state was to transmit the proposed amendment to the state legislature. Benson also contended that the version of the amendment that the Kentucky legislature made up and acted upon omitted the words "on income" from the text, and that the legislature therefore was not even voting on an income tax. Benson asserted that once this error was corrected, the Kentucky senate rejected the amendment, although Philander Knox counted Kentucky as having approved it.

Benson also contended that in Oklahoma, the legislature changed the wording of the amendment so that its meaning was virtually the opposite of what was intended by Congress, and that this was the version they sent back to Knox. Benson alleged that Knox counted Oklahoma as having approved it, despite a memo from his chief legal counsel, Reuben Clark, that states were not allowed to change the proposal in any way.

Benson argued that attorneys who studied the subject had agreed that Kentucky and Oklahoma should not have been counted as approvals by Philander Knox, and that if any state could be shown to have violated its own state constitution or laws in its approval process, then that state's approval would have to be thrown out.

The earliest reported court cases where Benson's arguments were actually raised appear to be United States v. Wojtas and United States v. House. Benson testified in the House case to no avail. The Benson contention was comprehensively addressed by the Seventh Circuit Court of Appeals in United States v. Thomas:

Benson was unsuccessful with his Sixteenth Amendment argument when he had his own legal problems. He was prosecuted for tax evasion and willful failure to file tax returns. The court rejected his Sixteenth Amendment "non-ratification" argument in United States v. Benson. William J. Benson was convicted of tax evasion and willful failure to file tax returns in connection with over $100,000 of unreported income, and his conviction was upheld on appeal. He was sentenced to four years in prison and five years of probation.

On December 17, 2007, the United States District Court for the Northern District of Illinois ruled that Benson's non-ratification argument constituted a "fraud perpetrated by Benson" that had "caused needless confusion and a waste of the customers' and the IRS' time and resources". The court stated: "Benson has failed to point to evidence that would create a genuinely disputed fact regarding whether the Sixteenth Amendment was properly ratified or whether United States Citizens are legally obligated to pay federal taxes." The court granted an injunction under  prohibiting Benson from promoting the theories in Benson's "Reliance Defense Package" (containing the non-ratification argument), which the court referred to as "false and fraudulent advice concerning the payment of federal taxes".

Benson appealed that decision, and the United States Court of Appeals for the Seventh Circuit also ruled against Benson. The Court of Appeals stated:

The Court of Appeals also ruled that the government could obtain a ruling ordering Benson to turn his customer list over to the government. Benson petitioned the United States Supreme Court, and the Supreme Court rejected his petition on November 30, 2009.

In Stubbs v. Commissioner, Charles Stubbs argued that he had no Federal income tax liability because the Sixteenth Amendment had not been ratified properly. The Court rejected that argument, stating: "we find Stubbs' argument without merit. Notification by a state that it has ratified an amendment is binding upon the Secretary of State, and his official certification of ratification is conclusive upon the courts. ... Stubbs' assertion of fraudulent behavior on the part of the Secretary of State in certifying ratification does not remove the Secretary's determination from this conclusive effect." Similar Sixteenth Amendment arguments have been uniformly rejected by other United States Circuit courts in other cases including Sisk v. Commissioner; United States v. Sitka; and United States v. Stahl. The non-ratification argument has been specifically deemed legally frivolous in Brown v. Commissioner; Lysiak v. Commissioner; and Miller v. United States.

Ohio's statehood

Another argument made by some tax protesters is that because the United States Congress did not pass an official proclamation (Pub. L. 204) recognizing the date of Ohio's 1803 admission to statehood until 1953 (see Ohio § Statehood and settlement), Ohio was not a state until 1953 and therefore the Sixteenth Amendment was not properly ratified. The earliest reported court case where this argument was raised appears to be Ivey v. United States, some sixty-three years after the ratification and 173 years after Ohio's admission as a state. This argument was rejected in the Ivey case, and has been uniformly rejected by the courts. See also McMullen v. United States, McCoy v. Alexander, Lorre v. Alexander, McKenney v. Blumenthal and Knoblauch v. Commissioner. Further, even if Ohio's ratification was not valid, the Amendment was ratified by 41 other states, well in excess of the 36 needed for it to be properly ratified.

In Baker v. Commissioner, the court stated:

The argument that the Sixteenth Amendment was not ratified and variations of this argument have been officially identified as legally frivolous federal tax return positions for purposes of the $5,000 frivolous tax return penalty imposed under Internal Revenue Code section 6702(a). The United States continues to recognize 1803 as the date when Ohio became a state, President Thomas Jefferson having signed, on February 19, 1803, an act of Congress that approved Ohio's boundaries and proposed state constitution. The resolution regarding this admission signed by President Dwight D. Eisenhower in 1953 recognizes March 1, 1803, as the date of Ohio's admittance into the Union.

Sixteenth Amendment importance

Repeal clause 
Some protesters have argued that because the Sixteenth Amendment does not contain the words "repeal" or "repealed", the Amendment is ineffective to change the law. According to legal commentator Daniel B. Evans:

In Buchbinder v. Commissioner, the taxpayers cited the case of Eisner v. Macomber and argued that "the Sixteenth Amendment must be interpreted so as not to 'repeal or modify' the original Articles of the Constitution". The United States Tax Court rejected that and all other arguments by Bruce and Elaine Buchbinder (the taxpayer-petitioners), stating: "We will not dress petitioners' frivolous tax-protester ramblings with a cloak of respectability. ... We find that petitioners in this case have pursued a frivolous cause of action. We find that they are liable for a penalty in the amount of $250.00 under the provisions of [Internal Revenue Code] section 6673." The actual statement by the United States Supreme Court in Eisner v. Macomber is that the Sixteenth Amendment "shall not be extended by loose construction, so as to repeal or modify, except as applied to income, those provisions of the Constitution that require an apportionment according to population for direct taxes upon property, real and personal ... In order, therefore, that the clauses cited from Article I of the Constitution may have proper force and effect, save only as modified by the Amendment ... it becomes essential to distinguish between what is and what is not 'income'."

Stanton v. Baltic Mining Co. 

In Parker v. Commissioner, tax protester Alton M. Parker, Sr., challenged the levying of tax upon individual income, based on language in the U.S. Supreme Court decision in Stanton v. Baltic Mining Co., to the effect that the Sixteenth Amendment "conferred no new power of taxation, but simply prohibited the previous complete and plenary power of income taxation possessed by Congress from the beginning from being taken out of the category of indirect taxation to which it inherently belonged". The United States Court of Appeals for the Fifth Circuit rejected Parker's argument, and stated that Parker's proposition is "only partially correct, and in its critical aspect, is incorrect". The Court of Appeals re-affirmed that the Congress has the power to impose the income tax, and stated that the Sixteenth Amendment "merely eliminates the requirement that the direct income tax be apportioned among the states". The court ruled that Parker had raised a "frivolous" appeal.

Tax protesters argue that in light of this language, the income tax is unconstitutional in that it is a direct tax and that the tax should be apportioned (divided equally amongst the population of the various states).

The above quoted language in Stanton v. Baltic Mining Co. is not a holding of law in the case. (Compare Ratio decidendi, Precedent, Stare decisis and Obiter dictum for a fuller explanation.)

The quoted language regarding the "complete and plenary power of income taxation possessed by Congress from the beginning" is a reference to the power granted to Congress by the original text of Article I of the U.S. Constitution. The reference to "being taken out of the category of indirect taxation to which it [the income tax] belonged" is a reference to the effect of the 1895 Court decision in Pollock v. Farmers' Loan & Trust Co., where taxes on income from property (such as interest income and dividend income) – which, like taxes on income from labor, had always been considered indirect taxes (and therefore not subject to the apportionment rule) – were, beginning in 1895, treated as direct taxes. The Sixteenth Amendment overruled the effect of Pollock, making the source of the income irrelevant with respect to the apportionment rule, and thereby placing taxes on income from property back into the category of indirect taxes such as income from labor (the Sixteenth Amendment expressly stating that Congress has power to impose income taxes regardless of the source of the income, without apportionment among the states, and without regard to any census or enumeration).

The Court noted that the case "was commenced by the appellant [John R. Stanton] as a stockholder of the Baltic Mining Company, the appellee, to enjoin [i.e., prevent] the voluntary payment by the corporation and its officers of the tax assessed against it under the income tax section of the tariff act of October 3, 1913". On a direct appeal from the trial court, the U.S. Supreme Court affirmed the lower court's decision, which had dismissed Stanton's motion (i.e., had rejected Stanton's request) for a court order to prevent Baltic Mining Company from paying the income tax.

Stanton argued that the tax law was unconstitutional and void under the Fifth Amendment to the United States Constitution in that the law denied "to mining companies and their stockholders equal protection of the laws and deprive[d] them of their property without due process of law". The Court rejected that argument. Stanton also argued that the Sixteenth Amendment "authorizes only an exceptional direct income tax without apportionment, to which the tax in question does not conform" and that therefore the income tax was "not within the authority of that Amendment". The Court also rejected this argument. Thus, the U.S. Supreme Court, in upholding the constitutionality of the income tax under the 1913 Act, contradicts those tax protesters' arguments that the income tax is unconstitutional under either the Fifth Amendment or the Sixteenth Amendment.

Summary

According to the Congressional Research Service at the Library of Congress, a total of forty-two states have ratified the amendment.

Tax lawyer Alan O. Dixler wrote:

In Abrams v. Commissioner, the United States Tax Court stated: "Since the ratification of the Sixteenth Amendment, it is immaterial with respect to income taxes, whether the tax is a direct or indirect tax. The whole purpose of the Sixteenth Amendment was to relieve all income taxes when imposed from [the requirement of] apportionment and from [the requirement of] a consideration of the source whence the income was derived."

See also
Tax protester constitutional arguments
 Tax protester history in the United States
 Tax resistance

Notes

References
 
 
 
 
 Danshera Cords, Tax Protestors and Penalties: Ensuring Perceived Fairness and Mitigating Systemic Costs, 2005 B.Y.U.L. Rev. 1515 (2005).
 Kenneth H. Ryesky, Of Taxes and Duties: Taxing the System with Public Employees' Tax Obligations, 31 Akron L. Rev. 349 (1998).
 Christopher S. Jackson, "The Inane Gospel of Tax Protest: Resist Rendering Unto Caesar - Whatever His Demands", 32 Gonzaga Law Review 291-329 (1996–97).
Allen D. Madison, "The Futility of Tax Protester Arguments," 36 Thomas Jefferson Law Review 253 (Vol. 36, No. 2, Spring 2014).

External links
 Tax Protester FAQ - specific rebuttals concerning the ratification of the 16th amendment
 The Truth About Frivolous Tax Arguments- The official response of the IRS.
 16th Amendment ratification documents - at the U.S. National Archives on Fold3

United States constitutional law
Taxation in the United States
Tax resistance in the United States